The first series of the British television sitcom Absolutely Fabulous premiered on BBC Two on 12 November 1992 and concluded on 17 December 1992, consisting of six episodes. The sitcom was created and written by Jennifer Saunders, who starred in the title role of Edina Monsoon, a heavy-drinking, smoking, and drug-abusing PR agent who has dedicated most of her life to looking "fabulous" and desperately attempts to stay young. Edina is nicknamed 'Eddie' by her best friend, Patsy Stone (Joanna Lumley), a magazine editor who constantly takes advantage of Edina by living the life of luxury in Edina's extravagant home. Edina is a twice-divorced mother of two. Her eldest child, a son, Serge, left home many years before in order to escape his mother's clutches. Her long-suffering daughter, Saffron 'Saffy', whom Edina is reliant upon, is a sixth form student and remains at home. The series also includes Edina's sweet-natured-but-slightly-batty mother (June Whitfield), whom Edina sees as an interfering burden, and Edina's dim-witted assistant Bubble (Jane Horrocks).

The series was conceived from the French and Saunders sketch "Modern Mother and Daughter", originally written by Saunders and Dawn French. Saunders has stated that the character of Edina Monsoon was based upon Lynne Franks, a PR agent whom she had joined on holiday.

Cast and characters

Main
 Jennifer Saunders as Edina Monsoon
 Joanna Lumley as Patsy Stone
 Julia Sawalha as Saffron Monsoon
 Jane Horrocks as Bubble

Special guest
 June Whitfield as Mother

Recurring
 Christopher Malcolm as Justin

Guest

 Nickolas Grace as Jonny
 Lucy Blair as Lou-Lou (uncredited)
 Alexandra Bastedo as Penny Caspar-Morse
 Anthony Asbury as Georgy
 Russell Kilmister as surgeon
 Geoffrey McGivern as customs officer
 Juliette Mole as air hostess
 Robert Ripa as old Frenchman
 Tim Woodward as headmaster
 Naoko Mori as Sarah
 Lisa Coleman as Joanna
 Adrian Ross-Magenty as James
 James Lance as Daniel
 Paul Mark Elliot as teacher
 Sidney Cole as teacher
 Annabelle Hampson as headmistress
 Melanie Jessop as secretary
 Trisha Aileen as school secretary
 Mo Gaffney as Bo
 Christopher Ryan as Marshall
 Gary Beadle as Oliver
 Kathy Burke as Magda
 Harriet Thorpe as Fleur
 Helen Lederer as Catriona
 Eleanor Bron as Patsy's mother
 Adrian Edmondson as Hamish
 Dawn French as Kathy

Episodes

Accolades

Release

Reception
Tim Gray of Variety magazine said that "Absolutely Fabulous, British sitcom about a rich, self-absorbed, falling-down-drunk woman, is not as funny as it intends to be, but it is absolutely unique, absolutely rude and absolutely politically incorrect". He also said that "AbFab offers no sense of justice, which may give viewers the heebie-jeebies, since Americans like to believe that the wicked, even if they are amusing, will get punished. But the characters are originals, and AbFab has the courage of its convictions, encouraging audiences to find humor in such recent comedic taboos as substance abuse or mistreated offspring."

In 1997, TV Guide ranked this episode number 47 on its list of the "100 Greatest Episodes of All-Time.

Home media
VHS

The first series of Absolutely Fabulous was released on VHS in the United Kingdom in two volumes; both of which containing three episodes per tape. These VHS tapes were released on 4 October 1993. The Complete Series 1 was released on VHS on 3 July 1995. The Complete Series 1 was again released as part of the Series 1-4 set and as an individual release on 25 November 2002.

DVD

Series 1 was made available in the United Kingdom on DVD format region 2 on 20 November 2000, and again as part of the Series 1-4 DVD set on 25 November 2002, The "Absolutely Everything" set (Series 1-5 & specials) on 15 November 2010, and most recently on the "Absolutely Everything: Definitive Edition" set (Series 1-5, specials & 20th Anniversary Specials) on 17 March 2014.

In North America, Series 1 was released several times on DVD region 1. It was initially released on 13 March 2001, with a re-issue on 13 September 2005. All subsequent releases following the initial release of Series 1 (apart from the re-issue) was released as part of DVD sets, with Series 1-3 released on 4 October 2005 and "Absolutely Everything" released on 28 May 2008.

In Australia, the first series debuted on DVD Region 4 on 3 October 2001. Australia was the first country to release "Absolutely Everything", although, not every episode was released within the set; it includes series 1-5 and the specials, excluding 'The Last Shout'. This set was released on 20 April 2006. "The Complete Collection" (every episode including 'The Last Shout') was made available on 5 April 2011.

References

External links
 Absolutely Fabulous series 1 – list of episodes on IMDb

1992 British television seasons
Series 1